The 2010 South Korean Figure Skating Championships were the South Korean Figure Skating Championships for the 2009–10 season. They were the 64th edition of those championships held. They were organized by the Korean Skating Union.

Skaters competed in the disciplines of men's and ladies' singles on the senior, junior, and novice levels for the title of national champion of South Korea. The results of the national championships were used to choose the Korean teams to the 2010 World Figure Skating Championships and the 2010 World Junior Figure Skating Championships. The teams to the 2010 Four Continents Figure Skating Championships and 2010 Winter Olympics had previously been chosen at a ranking competition in November, 2009.

The competition was held between 9 and 10 January 2010 at the Taereung Ice Rink in Seoul.

Competition notes
 Kim Yuna did not compete.
 Senior ladies champion Kim Hae-jin was age-ineligible for both the World Championships and the World Junior Championships. Kwak Min-jeong was therefore sent to the World Championships in her place.
 Senior ladies bronze medalist Park So-youn was also age-ineligible for the World Junior Championships.

Senior results

Men

Ladies

Junior results

Men

Ladies

Novice results

Boys

Girls

International team selections

Winter Olympics

World Championships

Four Continents Championships

World Junior Championships

External links
  

South Korean Figure Skating Championships
South Korean Figure Skating Championships, 2010
Figure skating
January 2010 sports events in South Korea